Araceli Segarra (born March 1970 in Lleida, Spain)  is the first Spanish woman to climb to the summit of Mount Everest. She has also climbed Broad Peak (Attempt, 1991),  Kanchenjunga (Attempts, 2001 and 2005), Shishapangma (Summit, 1992), and K2 (Attempt, 2002), among others.

Education and personal interests
Segarra has a degree in Physiotherapy. She became interested in mountain sports at age 15 when taking a spelunking course; she also enjoys randonee skiing, rock climbing, and ice climbing.

Career
In 1996, while being filmed for the IMAX documentary, EVEREST (1998), she participated on the rescue team during the May 1996 Mount Everest disaster and is credited with the idea of marking a rescue helicopter landing location with an "X" made of red Kool-Aid.

In addition to her climbing career, she has written and illustrated several children's books, like

See also
List of 20th-century summiters of Mount Everest

References

The Guardina. K2, the savage Mountain 

Spanish mountain climbers
Spanish summiters of Mount Everest
Living people
1970 births